Puzhal is a 2010 Indian Tamil language prison film directed by Azhagu Rajasundaram. The film stars newcomers Hemachandran, Mano, Murali, Aswatha, Archana Sharma and Sonam Singh, with Manobala, Ponnambalam, Dhandapani and Kadhal Sukumar playing supporting roles. The film, produced by T. Tamil Amudhan, had musical score by Nallathambi and was released on 3 September 2010.

Plot

John, Muthupandi and Ameer who are youth and from different backgrounds enter Puzhal Central Prison on charges of murder and they immediately bond. The jail warden Pottu and gangster Arumaidoss smuggle paan and alcohol while Anbu's son smuggles mobile phones.

Several flashbacks tell the story of the three youth and how they landed in jail. Muthupandi lived with his widowed mother, despite being poor, Muthupandi studied in an engineering college. Muthupandi and the village belle Ponni fell in love with each other. One day, his mother could not pay his college fees, so she begged the college chairman to help her but he forced her to have sex with him. When Muthupandi learned of it, he was shocked, his mother then apologized to him for the matter and killed herself. To save his mother's dignity, Muthupandi surrendered to the police for killing her. Whereas, Ameer was a sales representative and lived with his parents and elder sister Nisha. Nisha fell in love with a married man and decided to elope with him, but Ameer stopped them and he changed the married man's mind. Ameer then fatally strangled his sister. Whilst John was a kabaddi player and was in love with Rita but she married her uncle David. A saddened John discovered that David was infected with HIV and John interrupted the couple's first night, and killed David.

Back to the present, the cellmate of the youngsters is brutally raped by Arumaidoss and he kills himself by slitting his throat. John, Muthupandi and Ameer took revenge by beating up Pottu and Arumaidoss, they then murder Arumaidoss. After this incident, Anbu, a local bigwig, frees his son and the three boys on bail and recruits them as his henchmen. One day, Anbu who is involved in land grabbing forces an orphanage to give him their land. John, Muthupandi and Ameer who cannot tolerate it fight against Anbu and his henchmen. During the fight, David's brother tries to kill John with a machete. Muthupandi and Ameer get between them, so he fatally stabs the three friends.

Cast

Hemachandran as John
Mano as Muthupandi
Murali as Ameer
Aswatha as Ponni
Archana Sharma as Rita
Sonam Singh as Nisha
Manobala as Alex
Ponnambalam as College chairman
Dhandapani as Anbu
Kadhal Sukumar as Anbu's son
Azhagu
Aadhavan
Arjun G Iyengar
Vishnuram
Shakeela as Shakeela
Aishwarya
Lasya
Charmila as Rita's mother
Shanthi Anand
T. Tamil Amudhan

Production
Azhagu Rajasundaram who directed films such as Thathi Thavadhu Manasu (2003) and Super Da (2004) made his return with the thriller film Puzhal under the banner of Classic Movies. Newcomers Hemachandran, Mano and Murali were chosen to play the lead role while Aswatha, Archana Sharma and Sonam Singh were selected to play the heroines. The director said, "The story of Puzhal is inspired from my own life. As shooting inside Puzhal jail was not easy, we have decided to erect a set similar to it and shoot there".

Soundtrack

The film score and the soundtrack were composed by Nallathambi. The soundtrack features 6 tracks.

Release
The film was released on 3 September 2010 alongside five other films.

The Times Of India gave 1.5 out of 5 and said, "Each of the heroes have duets too, all slinky-clad, and the camera obligingly swoops low, capturing all the curves. There are loads of mother-son sentiment in one segment which might make television mega serials turn green with envy" and concluded, "It starts out well and plunges into something that may work in C centres".

References

2010 films
2010s Tamil-language films
Indian prison films
Indian drama films